The Town of Coal Creek is a Statutory Town located in Fremont County, Colorado, United States. The town population was 364 at the 2020 United States Census. Coal Creek is a part of the Cañon City, CO Micropolitan Statistical Area and the Front Range Urban Corridor.

History
A post office called Coal Creek has been in operation since 1873.  The community was named for the local coal mining industry.

Geography
Coal Creek is located in southeastern Fremont County at  (38.360463, -105.146512). The town of Rockvale is to the west, Williamsburg is to the northwest, and the city of Florence is to the northeast.

Demographics

As of the census of 2000, there were 303 people, 114 households, and 76 families residing in the town. The racial makeup of the town was 94.72% White, 0.66% African American, 0.33% Asian, 0.99% from other races, and 3.30% from two or more races. Hispanic or Latino of any race were 1.98% of the population.

There were 114 households, out of which 37.7% had children under the age of 18 living with them, 48.2% were married couples living together, 14.9% had a female householder with no husband present, and 32.5% were non-families. 27.2% of all households were made up of individuals, and 14.0% had someone living alone who was 65 years of age or older. The average household size was 2.66 and the average family size was 3.25.

In the town, the population was spread out, with 31.4% under the age of 18, 5.0% from 18 to 24, 28.1% from 25 to 44, 24.8% from 45 to 64, and 10.9% who were 65 years of age or older. The median age was 37 years. For every 100 females, there were 91.8 males. For every 100 females age 18 and over, there were 84.1 males.

The median income for a household in the town was $26,563, and the median income for a family was $29,583. Males had a median income of $17,500 versus $21,250 for females. The per capita income for the town was $12,563. About 14.3% of families and 18.6% of the population were below the poverty line, including 28.3% of those under the age of eighteen and none of those 65 or over.

See also

Colorado
Bibliography of Colorado
Index of Colorado-related articles
Outline of Colorado
List of counties in Colorado
List of municipalities in Colorado
List of places in Colorado
List of statistical areas in Colorado
Front Range Urban Corridor
South Central Colorado Urban Area
Pueblo-Cañon City, CO Combined Statistical Area
Cañon City, CO Micropolitan Statistical Area

References

External links

Town of Coal Creek website
CDOT map of the Town of Coal Creek

Towns in Fremont County, Colorado
Towns in Colorado